BSAS may refer to:

 Bachelor of Science in Architectural Studies
 Bergen Shopping Addiction Scale
 Bosley-Salih-Alorainy syndrome
 British Social Attitudes Survey
 British Society of Animal Science
 Buenos Aires (Bs. As.)